Kyle Justin McCarthy (born September 30, 1986) is a former American football safety. He was signed by the Denver Broncos as an undrafted free agent in 2010. He played college football at Notre Dame.  He was a quarterback at Cardinal Mooney High School in Youngstown, OH where he led his 2004 football team to an OHSAA Division IV State Title.

High school and college career 
McCarthy played as a quarterback at Cardinal Mooney High School in Youngstown, Ohio. In 2005, he committed to Notre Dame University.

|}

References

External links
Kansas City Chiefs bio
Denver Broncos bio
Notre Dame Fighting Irish bio

1986 births
Living people
Players of American football from Youngstown, Ohio
American football safeties
Notre Dame Fighting Irish football players
Denver Broncos players
Kansas City Chiefs players
Oakland Raiders players